Multnomah Whiskey Library is a drinking parlor and restaurant in Portland, Oregon, United States.

Reception
Multnomah Whiskey Library was a runner-up in the "Best Cocktail Lounge" category of Willamette Week "Best of Portland Readers' Poll 2020".

References

External links
 
 

2013 establishments in Oregon
Restaurants established in 2013
Restaurants in Portland, Oregon
Southwest Portland, Oregon
Whisky
Drinking establishments in Oregon